The Dubai Civil Defense (DCD) is an Emergency Management Organisation of Dubai, United Arab Emirates.

Vision 
To have the UAE as one of the most secure and safest countries in the world.

Organisation Structure 
The organisation is headed by Major General Rashid Thani Rashid Al Matroushi and consists of various other departments as mentioned below:

The Deputy Director General (DDG)
 Internal Monitoring Department
 Corporal Strategy & Performance Department (CSP)

Director's Administrative Advisor (DAA)
 Services & Supplies Department
 Human Resources Department
 Financial Affairs Department
 Public Relations Department
 Information Technology Department

Director's Advisor for Safety, Protection and Training (DASPT)
 Civil Protection Department
 Preventive Safety Department
 Training Department

Director's Advisor for Fire and Rescue (DAFRA)
 Bur Dubai Fire and Rescue Department
 Diera Fire and Rescue Department
 Fire Stations Affair Department
 Jebel Ali Fire and Rescue Department
 Sea Fire and Rescue Department
 Air Fire and Rescue Department
 Operations Room Department
 Technical Affairs Department

Emergency Number 
Dubai Civil Defense can be reached in case of an emergency by dialling 997.

Vehicles 
The Dubai Civil Defense has a wide range of vehicles to serve emergency situations and for rescue operations. The Dubai Civil Defense also has Chevrolet Corvette as part of its vehicle array.

In 2015, it was reported that Dubai Civil Defense had placed an initial order for twenty Martin Jetpacks, simulators, and training, for delivery in 2016. The principal application is fire department use for rescue from Dubai's extremely tall buildings. Dubai Civil Defense also has a fire boat/ fire jetski and a drone.

Gallery

References

External links 
 Dubai Civil Defense Website - Arabic Version
 Dubai Civil Defense Website - English Version

Fire departments of the United Arab Emirates
Government agencies of Dubai